JAAS may refer to: 

 Journal of Analytical Atomic Spectrometry
 Journal of Asia Adventist Seminary
 Java Authentication and Authorization Service